Frederick Mervyn Kieran Johnston  (22 October 1911 – 13 November 2005) was the Archdeacon of Cork from 1959 until 1967; and then Dean of Cork from 1967 until 1986.

He was educated at Trinity College, Dublin and ordained in 1936. After curacies in Castlecomer and Corkhe held incumbencies at Kilmeen, Drimoleague, Blackrock and Moviddy.

References

1911 births
2005 deaths
Alumni of Trinity College Dublin
Archdeacons of Cork
Deans of Cork